Sardis is a small community on the south side of Chilliwack, about  from downtown, in the Fraser River Valley. Sardis is the urban core of the south side of Chilliwack and a popular shopping destination.

History 

A.C. Wells, Adam Vedder and Jane Evans were the first known farmers to settle in Sardis around 1860. The name "Sardis" was chosen by Mrs. Vedder after the historical capital of Lydia in present-day Turkey. The British Columbia Electric Railway reached Sardis in 1910.

Parks and recreation 

 Sardis Park
 A  park that is also a sanctuary for a number of wild fowl species, including the mute swans that live in the park year-round, and the migratory trumpeter swans in summer.

 Watson Glen Park
 A  park that includes tennis courts, a ball hockey box, a skate park, and three indoor hockey rinks.

 Cheam Leisure Centre
 A leisure centre that includes squash courts, a weight room, fitness equipment, a double gymnasium, a 25-metre swimming pool, a leisure pool, an artificial river, a hot tub and a sauna.

 Webster Landing skate park
 Track for skateboards and BMX bicycles

 Sardis Library
 A multi-purpose library and community centre in the Watson Glen neighbourhood.

Shopping and entertainment 

Luckakuck Way is a popular destination for shopping, restaurants and cinema. It includes two major shopping malls, numerous retail outlets and a cinema.

Climate

See also 
 Neighbourhoods in Chilliwack
 Canada Education Park

References

External links 
 Community of Villages
 BC Geographical names
 Sardis Library Project

Sardis